The Istanbul Volleyball League was a volleyball league competition in Turkey, run by the Turkish Volleyball Federation from 1921 to 1970.

Champions

Performance

References

 Atabeyoğlu, Cem. 1453–1991 Türk Spor Tarihi Ansiklopedisi. page(558).(1991) An Grafik Basın Sanayi ve Ticaret AŞ
 Dağlaroğlu, Rüştü; "Fenerbahçe Spor Kulübü Tarihi 1907–57", İstanbul (1957),
 Somalı, Vala, "Türk-Dünya Voleybol Tarihi 1896–1986", İstanbul (1986),

Volleyball leagues in Turkey
Turkey
Defunct sports leagues in Turkey
1921 establishments in the Ottoman Empire
1970 disestablishments in Turkey